Bodybuilder is a 2022 Russian thriller sports film directed by Andrey Grachyov. It is scheduled to be theatrically released on April 7, 2022.

Plot 
The film tells about a famous bodybuilder named Max, who dreams of becoming a world champion, but he is forced to leave the sport due to health problems.

Cast

References

External links 
 

2022 films
2020s Russian-language films
Russian thriller films
Russian sports films
2022 thriller films
2020s sports films